Carabus marietti marietti is a subspecies of ground beetle in the Carabinae subfamily that is can be found in Bulgaria and Turkey. The species are black coloured with red pronotum.

References

marietti marietti
Beetles described in 1837